Rockshocks is an album of self-covers by the Japanese heavy metal band Loudness. The album, released in Japan in 2004, contains tracks taken from the first five studio album of the band from the 1980s, played again with a more modern sound and different musical arrangements than the originals. The album was published in the USA in 2006 by Crash Records, with three bonus tracks taken from the album Racing: "Exultation", "Lunatic" and "R.I.P.".

Track listing
All music by Akira Takasaki, all lyrics by Minoru Niihara

"Loudness" - 5:05
"Crazy Doctor" - 4:21
"In the Mirror" - 3:41
"Crazy Night" - 4:33
"Esper" - 3:50
"Like Hell" - 4:00
"Lonely Player" - 5:53
"Street Woman" - 5:40
"Angel Dust" - 4:32
"Rock Shock" - 4:47
"The Lines Are Down" - 5:02
"Milky Way" - 4:27
"Mr. Yesman" - 7:22

Personnel
Loudness
Minoru Niihara - vocals
Akira Takasaki - guitars
Masayoshi Yamashita - bass
Munetaka Higuchi - drums

Production
Masatoshi Sakimoto - engineer, mixing
Yuki Mitome, Keiko Koizumi - assistant engineers
Yoichi Aikawa - mastering
Norikazu Shimano, Shinji Hamasaki - supervisors
Junji Tada - executive producer

References

Loudness (band) albums
2004 compilation albums
Japanese-language compilation albums